Image Comics is an American comic book publisher and is the third largest comic book and graphic novel publisher in the industry in both unit and market share. It was founded in 1992 by several high-profile illustrators as a venue for creator-owned properties, in which comics creators could publish material of their own creation without giving up the copyrights to those properties. Normally this isn't the case in the work for hire-dominated American comics industry, where the legal author is a publisher, such as Marvel Comics or DC Comics, and the creator is an employee of that publisher. Its output was originally dominated by superhero and fantasy series from the studios of the founding Image partners, but now includes comics in many genres by numerous independent creators. Its best-known publications include Spawn, Savage Dragon, Witchblade, Bone,   The Walking Dead, Invincible, Saga, Jupiter's Legacy, Kick-Ass and Radiant Black.

History

Founding

In the early 1990s, comics creators Erik Larsen, Rob Liefeld, and Jim Valentino had dinner with Malibu Comics editor-in-chief Dave Olbrich. Malibu was a small but established publishing company sympathetic to creator-ownership, and Olbrich expressed interest in publishing comics created by them. These and several other freelance illustrators doing popular work for Marvel Comics were growing frustrated with the company's work for hire policies and practices, which they felt did not sufficiently reward the talent that produced them, as the company heavily merchandised their artwork, and compensated them with modest royalties.

According to Todd McFarlane, he, Jim Lee and Liefeld met with Marvel president Terry Stewart and editor Tom DeFalco in late December 1991. Larsen and Marc Silvestri, who joined the group the night before, were not present, but the group that met with Stewart indicated that they were representing them as well. McFarlane says that they made no demands of Stewart or Marvel, but informed him that they were leaving, gave their reasons why, and cautioned Stewart to heed those reasons, lest the company suffer future departures. The creators had a similar meeting with DC Comics the next day, commenting that their new policies intended to be more beneficial to creators had been crafted unilaterally, without creators' input. After Whilce Portacio returned from his annual trip to the Philippines, his Homage Studios colleague Lee asked him to join the group.

A group of seven artists then announced the founding of Image Comics: McFarlane (known for his work on Spider-Man), Lee (X-Men), Liefeld (X-Force), Silvestri (Wolverine), Larsen (The Amazing Spider-Man), Valentino (Guardians of the Galaxy), and Portacio (Uncanny X-Men); with longtime Uncanny X-Men writer Chris Claremont (who was not actively involved with the group) adding his support. This development was nicknamed the "X-odus", because several of the artists involved (Liefeld, Lee, Silvestri, and Portacio) were famous for their work on the X-Men franchise. Marvel's stock fell $3.25/share when the news became public.

Image's organizing charter had two key provisions:
 Image would not own any creator's work; the creator would. Image itself would own no intellectual property except the company trademarks: its name and its logo (designed by writer Hank Kanalz).
 No Image partner would interfere – creatively or financially – with any other partner's work.

Each Image partner founded their own studio, which published under the Image banner but was autonomous from any central editorial control. Portacio withdrew during the formative stages to deal with his sister's illness, and former Incredible Hulk artist Dale Keown declined to take Portacio's place due to a criminal record impeding his ability to travel outside his home country of Canada, so Image originally consisted of six studios:
 Todd McFarlane Productions, owned by McFarlane
 Aegis, owned by Lee (later renamed WildStorm Productions)
 Highbrow Entertainment, owned by Larsen
 Shadowline, owned by Valentino
 Top Cow Productions, owned by Silvestri
 Extreme Studios, owned by Liefeld (later renamed Awesome Comics)

Development
The founders' initial titles were produced under the Image imprint, but published through Malibu Comics, which provided administrative, production, distribution, and marketing support for the launch of them.

The first Image comic books to arrive in stores were Liefeld's Youngblood, Larsen's The Savage Dragon, McFarlane's Spawn, and Lee's WildC.A.T.s. (Youngblood and Savage Dragon were not entirely new creations, having debuted in Gary Carlson's Megaton, an independent comic book title published from 1981 to 1987.) Propelled by the artists' popularity and the eagerness of comic book collectors to get in on the "next big thing", these series sold in numbers that no publisher other than Marvel, DC, or Valiant Comics had achieved in the years since the market's decline in the 1970s. (The company experienced lesser successes with Silvestri's Cyberforce, Valentino's Shadowhawk, and Portacio's much-delayed Wetworks.)  Within a few months, the Image titles' success led to Malibu having almost 10% of the North American comics market share, briefly exceeding that of industry giant DC Comics. By the beginning of 1993, Image's financial situation was secure enough to publish its titles independently, and it left Malibu.

Some of the founders' studios came to resemble separate publishers, each with several ongoing series set in a shared universe. (At first there were indications of an "Image Universe" shared by the studios, but these decreased as the studios developed their own directions.) The use of freelancers to write or illustrate series that were owned by the Image partners led to criticism that some of them had reproduced the very system they had rebelled against, but with them in charge instead of a corporation. Image partners such as Larsen and Valentino, who did not take this approach, assumed a neutral position on it, in keeping with the requirement that none of them had any say in how the others' studios were run.

Some of the Image partners used their studios to also publish new works produced by independent creators, allowing those people to retain ownership and editorial control over those series, an arrangement which was then uncommon among large publishers. These included Sam Kieth (The Maxx), Dale Keown (Pitt), Jae Lee (Hellshock), and the team of Kurt Busiek, Brent Anderson, and Alex Ross (Astro City). Later, some established self-published series also moved to Image, such as Jeff Smith's Bone and Colleen Doran's A Distant Soil.

The partners had little business or management experience, and many series quickly fell behind their intended publishing schedule. Comparing them to vaporware, one reader reported that 17 of the 36 delayed items in his December 1992 order were from Image. Retailers' advance orders of newly offered issues were typically based on the sales of recent issues, but as the issues shipped weeks and even several months late, fans' interest tended to wane, leaving retailers with inventory they could not sell when it arrived. In response, retailers cut orders to reduce their risk. This significantly hurt the studios, which were each responsible for their own cash flow and profitability. In late 1993, the partners hired independent cartoonist Larry Marder to act as "executive director" for the publisher; Valentino quipped in interviews that Marder's job was literally to "direct the executives" (i.e. the Image partners). Marder developed better financial planning and had some success in disciplining creators to deliver their work on time, in part by insisting that retail orders for new issues would not be solicited until the books had been illustrated, usually ensuring they would be ready to ship when promised.

By the mid-1990s Image series such as Spawn and The Savage Dragon had proven themselves as lasting successes (the former frequently topping the sales charts for months in which new issues came out), while new series such as Wildstorm's Gen¹³, and Top Cow's Witchblade and The Darkness were also successful. Image had become the third-largest comics publisher in North America, surpassed only by long-established industry leaders Marvel and DC Comics.

Partial break-up
Disagreements between partners began to develop. Several of the partners complained that Liefeld was using his position as CEO of Image to promote and perhaps even to financially support Maximum Press, a publishing company that Liefeld operated separately from Image. Silvestri withdrew Top Cow from Image in 1996 (although he retained his partnership in the company), protesting that Liefeld was recruiting artists from his studio, including highly popular Michael Turner (Witchblade). The other five partners discussed ousting Liefeld from the company, and Liefeld resigned in September 1996, giving up his share of the company. Silvestri subsequently returned Top Cow to Image.

Wildstorm's Cliffhanger imprint, established in 1998, was a commercial success, launching high-selling creator-owned properties by Humberto Ramos, J. Scott Campbell, Joe Madureira, and others. Jim Lee sold Wildstorm and its characters to DC Comics in 1999, citing a desire to exchange his responsibilities as a publisher for the opportunity to do more creative work.

Diversification

The founders of Image were best known for their dynamic and extravagant art, and for character-driven, thinly-plotted stories in the superhero genre. Although the company also published other styles of works, many readers came to perceive this as the "Image style" of comics. Valentino had become less active as a creator after the company's first few years, and responded to this development in 1997 by using his position as a partner to seek out and publish a number of titles by other creators in distinctly different genres and styles, in a deliberate attempt to diversify Image's output and how it was perceived. Although most of these series—ironically dubbed the "non-line" because of their lack of commonality—did not sell well and were soon cancelled, they introduced an increasingly important business model for the company: offering other creators the same total-ownership terms the partners enjoyed, but taking a fixed fee upon publication for the company's administrative costs. This practice was later formalized as a function of "Image Central", a business unit independent of any of the studios. This focus on non-studio comics increased when Valentino took on the role of Image's publisher, assuming many of the responsibilities held by Marder until Marder left the company in 1999.

The company's position in the North American direct market diminished in the 2000s, challenged by Dark Horse Comics and IDW Publishing for the position of "third largest publisher" after Marvel and DC. In February 2004, Larsen replaced Valentino as publisher, largely continuing existing business practices. Larsen stepped down as publisher in July 2008 and executive director Eric Stephenson was promoted to the position. Valentino returned to operating his own studio with his Shadowline imprint.

Shortly after Stephenson's appointment, Image added Robert Kirkman as the company's first new partner since its founding. Kirkman's black-and-white series The Walking Dead was at that time already a long-running and popular series (it would run for 193 issues and serve as the basis for three television series), and his series Invincible was one of the longest-running series featuring a superhero created in the early 2000s (it would run for 144 issues). Kirkman created an imprint under his direction, known as Skybound.

Starting in 2009, Image began to greatly expand both the types of comics it publishes and the types of creators drawn to the publisher, beginning a period of critical acclaim. Among its award-winning series, are Chew, Morning Glories, Fatale, The Manhattan Projects, and Saga. Saga creator Brian K. Vaughan explained why he chose Image to publish that series:

Image's sales grew significantly during this period to a market share of around 10% in 2015, and an influx of Marvel- and DC-associated creators began publishing creator-owned work with them. As a result, Image was voted Diamond Comic Distributors' Publisher of the Year Over 4% three years in a row between 2013 and 2015. By this time, a clear majority of titles Image published in a given month were non-studio productions. Meanwhile, McFarlane's Spawn and related titles, his McFarlane Toys line, Silvestri's Top Cow imprint, and Kirkman's various series remained a substantial segment of Image's total sales. , McFarlane's Spawn and Larsen's Savage Dragon were the longest-running creator-owned titles published by Image, with over 300 and 250 issues, respectively.

The company's headquarters moved from Berkeley, California to Portland, Oregon in 2017.

In November 2021, members of the editorial, production, sales, and accounting staff formed Comic Book Workers United (CBWU), a trade union affiliated with the Communications Workers of America; however, Image did not voluntarily recognize the union. When it was certified by a vote in January 2022, it became the first such union in the American comics industry. CBWU ratified their first union contract with Image Comics in March 2023.

List of imprints
This list also includes studios and partners.

Current
12-Gauge Comics
Arancia Studio
Black Market Narrative
Giant Generator
Highbrow Entertainment
Millarworld
Robert Kirkman, LLC
Skybound Entertainment
Skybound Games
Howyaknow, LLC
Todd McFarlane Productions
 Top Cow Productions
 Shadowline
Syzygy Publishing

Former
 Devil's Due Publishing
Gorilla Comics
 WildStorm
 America's Best Comics

Accolades
Image Comics titles have garnered both comics and mainstream critical acclaim. Image Comics titles boast multiple award nominations and wins across all categories in the Eisner Awards, Hugo Awards, Russ Manning Awards, The Edgar Awards, Bram Stoker Awards, Young Adult Library Association’s Great Graphic Novels for Teens, and more. Image Comics’ title list includes domestic and international bestsellers with regular appearances on The New York Times bestseller list, The Washington Posts bestseller list, USA Todays bestseller list, the Amazon.com bestseller list, and more.

In July 2018, Marjorie Liu won the Eisner Award for Best Writer for her work on Monstress, making her the first woman in history to win in the category.

In April 2019, Image Comics titles received a total 30 Eisner Award nominations—more than any other nominated publisher—and made history as the first publisher to sweep the Best New Series category, with all six titles nominated published by Image.

See also

 List of Image Comics publications
 Image Universe
 List of unproduced Image Comics projects
 List of television series and films based on Image Comics publications

Notes

References

Citations

Sources

 Khoury, George (June 2007).Image Comics: The Road To Independence TwoMorrows Publishing. ,  excerpts:
 "McFarlane and Khoury on 15 Years of Image Comics" . Comic Book Resources. June 13, 2007
 "Marc Silvestri from Image Comics: The Road to Independence". Newsarama. June 14, 2007
 Dale Keown excerpt from Image Comics: The Road to Independence, June 14, 2007
 
 Image Comics. Big Comic Book DataBase.

External links

 
 

 
1992 establishments in California
Book publishing companies based in Oregon
Companies based in Portland, Oregon
Publishers of adult comics
Publishing companies established in 1992
Privately held companies based in Oregon
Todd McFarlane